Sakurai Station (桜井駅) is the name of multiple train stations in Japan:

 Sakurai Station (Aichi)
 Sakurai Station (Nara)
 Sakurai Station (Osaka)